Delhi Daredevils (DD) are a franchise cricket team based in Delhi, India, which plays in the Indian Premier League (IPL). They were one of the nine teams that competed in the 2013 Indian Premier League. They were captained by Mahela Jayawardene. Delhi Daredevils finished ninth in the IPL and did not qualify for the Champions League T20.

Indian Premier League

Standings
Delhi Daredevils finished last in the league stage of IPL 2013.

Match log

Statistics

References

2013 Indian Premier League
Delhi Capitals seasons